Ghonda is an affluent residential area located in the North East Delhi Legislative Assembly district.

Politics
During the last few decades, residents of Ghonda have generally supported the Bhartiya Janata Party (BJP), who have been in power in the area since the Lok Sabha elections of the Northeast Delhi constituency in 1993. The second most popular political party within Ghonda was historically the Indian National Congress (INC), which performed well in the 1998, 2003, and 2008 local elections. In the 2015 election, the residents of Ghonda elected representatives from the Aam Aadmi Party (AAP), ending the almost-decade long INC and BJP winning streaks. However, in 2020, the constituency again became a BJP stronghold.

Notable people 

 Ajay Mahawar is the Member of the Legislative Assembly (MLA) representing the Ghonda area.
 Manoj Tiwari is the member of the National Lok Sabha (Parliament) representing this area.
 A well-known social advocate, Sarfraz Ahmed from Sarai Ghasi, lives in the C block of Yamuna Vihar in Ghonda.

Schools 
Notable schools in this area include:

 Nav Jeewan Adarsh Public School
 Pt. Yadram Secondary Public School at Bhajanpura Thana Road

Attractions

 Dilli Darbar Sweets and Chat Corner
 Pahadi Mandir (Shiv Mandir)
 Subhash Vihar Gali No.10
 Gulzar Chicken Biryani , momeen Chawk
 Nav Yuvak Ramlila in Subhash Vihar
 Eid Mela at DDA Ground
 Saree Mahal Emporium (ladies' warehouse)
 Anuradha Saree Emporium (ladies' warehouse)
 Ayurdarshan Healthcare

External links 
 MCD Hospital, Ghonda at wikimapia

References

Cities and towns in North East Delhi district